The 1999 Texas Tech Red Raiders football team represented the Texas Tech University as a member of the Big 12 Conference during the 1999 NCAA Division I-A football season. Led by Spike Dykes in his 13th and final season as head coach, the Red Raiders compiled an overall record of 6–5 with a mark of 5–3, placing in a three-way tie for second in the Big 12's South Division. Team team's offense scored 253 points while the defense allowed 282 points on the season.

Previous season

The 1998 team finished the regular season with a 7–4 record, 4–4 in Big 12 play. The Red Raiders were invited to the Independence Bowl, losing 18–35 to Ole Miss, finishing with an overall record of 7–5.

Schedule

Game summaries

Oklahoma

In Spike Dykes's final game as the Red Raiders' head coach, the team came back from a 21–13 halftime deficit to win 38–28 over the Sooners. Dykes finished his career at Texas Tech with an overall record of 82–67–1 through 13 seasons. Oklahoma's offensive coordinator, Mike Leach, would serve as Dyke's successor.

Team players drafted into the NFL

References

Texas Tech
Texas Tech Red Raiders football seasons
Texas Tech Red Raiders football